James Stedman (fl.1659), was an English Member of Parliament.

He was a Member (MP) of the Parliament of England for Chippenham in 1659.

References

Year of birth missing
Year of death missing
17th-century English people
People of the Stuart period
Members of the Parliament of England (pre-1707)